Besh-Aral Nature Reserve is a nature reserve in Chatkal District, Jalal-Abad Region, western Kyrgyzstan. Established in 1979, it currently covers 112,463 hectares. It is situated in the basin of the rivers Ters and Chatkal, between 950 and 2300 m elevation.

This is a mountainous region with untouched wild landscapes, turbulent rivers, vast meadows, and great biodiversity.

History
Besh-Aral Nature Reserve was established on March 21, 1979, to preserve the unique natural complex and forests of the Chatkal valley, as well as to protect the habitat of the Menzbier's Marmot and to protect the natural habitat of vegetation of Greig's and Kaufmann's tulips. The area of the reserve amounted to 116,700 hectares. In 1994,in regard with the establishment of Chatkal Forestry the boundaries of the reserve were changed and area reduced to 63,200 hectares (Government Decree No 573 of August 1, 1994). On July 16, 2002, the habitats of Menzbir's marmot (Marmota menzbieri) and other areas were re-subordinated to the nature reserve, and its area increased to 86,748 hectares (Government Decree No 499 of July 26, 2002). In 2006, extension of the Besh-Aral State Nature Reserve with the Chandalash game reserve area increased the area with 25,715 hectares.

References
 

Nature reserves in Kyrgyzstan
Protected areas established in 1979